The 2013–14 Green Bay Phoenix women's basketball team represents the University of Wisconsin-Green Bay in the 2013–14 NCAA Division I women's basketball season. Their head coach is Kevin Borseth. The Phoenix play their home games at the Kress Events Center and were members of the Horizon League. It is the 35th season of Green Bay women's basketball. Last year they finished the season 29-3, 16-0 in Horizon League play to finish first overall. As an eleven seed, the Phoenix lost their first round match in the 2013 NCAA tournament to the LSU Lady Tigers.

The Phoenix clinched a share of their 16th straight and 19th overall conference championship with a 67-52 win over Horizon League newcomer Oakland on March 6. They also earned the number one seed in the 2014 Horizon League women's basketball tournament with the win. With their 72-52 win over Detroit on March 8, the Phoenix took sole possession of the conference regular season title.

Roster

Schedule

|-
!colspan=9 style="background:#006633; color:#FFFFFF;"|  Regular Season

|-
!colspan=9 style="background:#006633; color:#FFFFFF;"| Horizon League regular season

 
 

  
  
 
 
 
 
 
|-
!colspan=9 style="background:#006633; color:#FFFFFF;"| 2014 Horizon League Tournament

|-
!colspan=9 style="background:#006633; color:#FFFFFF;"| 2014 WNIT

Awards and honors

Horizon League Awards
Freshman of the Year: Tesha Buck
Coach of the Year: Kevin Borseth
All-League Second Team: Kaili Lukan
All-Freshman Team: Tesha Buck, Mehryn Kraker
All-Defensive Team: Megan Lukan

References

Green Bay Phoenix
Green Bay Phoenix women's basketball seasons
2014 Women's National Invitation Tournament participants